Novaculops pastellus, the Lord Howe sandy, is a fish of the family Labridae, subfamily Xyrichtyinae, commonly known as razorfishes. It's a rare fish known only from the Lord Howe Island region in the Tasman Sea, and inhabits open sandy bottoms. Like other razorfishes, it dives quickly into the sand when threatened. This species was originally described in the genus Xyrichthys and later transferred to Novaculops. It is listed as Least Concern in the IUCN Red List.

References 

Fish described in 2008
Taxa named by John Ernest Randall
Labridae
Taxa named by Luiz A. Rocha